Bhesa sinica is an evergreen tree with buttressed trunk in the Centroplacaceae family. It is endemic to China, being only known from the coast of Guanxi. Only three mature trees and a few saplings are known to exist in the wild.

References

sinica
Endemic flora of China
Trees of China
Critically endangered plants
Taxonomy articles created by Polbot
Plants described in 1981